Serene is one of the world's largest private superyachts.

Built by Italian shipyard Fincantieri with interior design by Reymond Langton Design, Serene was delivered to her owner in August 2011.

Ownership
The ship was built for Russian vodka tycoon Yuri Shefler for $330m. In the summer of 2014, Bill Gates leased the yacht for US$5 million per week.

In 2014, while vacationing in the south of France, Crown Prince Mohammed bin Salman of Saudi Arabia bought the vessel from Yuri Shefler for approximately €500 million.

Incident at sea
She sustained significant damage to her hull at the bow. The cause was reported to be a combination of navigational error and propulsion failure.

Trivia
Reportedly, the Da Vinci  painting Salvator Mundi is on board the yacht.

References

Motor yachts
2010 ships
Ships built by Fincantieri